Cabbages and Kings is a quotation from "The Walrus and the Carpenter" and may refer to:

Cabbages and Kings (novel), a 1904 novel by O. Henry
Cabbages and Kings (Canadian TV program), a 1955 Canadian panel discussion television program which aired on CBC
Cabbages and Kings (UK TV series), a 1972–1974 British children's television series which aired on BBC1

See also
Of Cabbages and Kings (disambiguation)